Edward Donald Stone (born January 5, 1937) was an American college and professional football player.  

A halfback, Stone played college football at the University of Arkansas, and played professionally in the American Football League for the Denver Broncos from 1961 through 1964, and then for the AFL's Buffalo Bills and Houston Oilers.  He was an American Football League All-Star in 1961.

See also
Other American Football League players

References

External links
Stone's 1963 Fleer football card

1937 births
Living people
American Football League All-Star players
Denver Broncos (AFL) players
Buffalo Bills players
Houston Oilers players
Arkansas Razorbacks football players
Players of American football from Iowa
Sportspeople from Sioux City, Iowa
American Football League players